Mosonszolnok, is a village in Győr-Moson-Sopron county, Hungary.

Etymology
The name is of Slavic origin, most likely derived from Soľnik. "Soľ" (salt) + derivational suffix "-nik" meaning "salt store". Less probable theory is Slavic stavnik, literally "a stopping place" (a place to check goods and to exchange horses).

See also
Mosonszolnok Wind Farm

References

External links 
 Street map 

Populated places in Győr-Moson-Sopron County
Hungarian German communities